The 2022–23 Bangladesh Women's Super League (BWSL) is inaugural season of the Bangladesh Women's Super League, a women's franchise football league in Bangladesh. The league Will start from May 2023 and six team are participate in the league.

Venues
The all matches will be played following these two grounds.

References

 Football in Bangladesh 
2022–23 domestic women's association football leagues
2022–23 in Asian association football leagues